William Jasper Frizzell (born September 8, 1962) is a former American football cornerback in the National Football League (NFL) for the Detroit Lions, Philadelphia Eagles, and the Tampa Bay Buccaneers from 1984 to 1993.  He played college football at North Carolina Central University and was drafted in the tenth round of the 1984 NFL Draft. Frizzell wore number 26 for the Detroit Lions and number 33 for the Philadelphia Eagles and Tampa Bay Buccaneers.

1962 births
American football safeties
Detroit Lions players
Living people
North Carolina Central Eagles football players
Sportspeople from Greenville, North Carolina
Philadelphia Eagles players
Tampa Bay Buccaneers players
Players of American football from North Carolina